Carpenter Mountain can refer to the following mountains in the United States:

Carpenter Mountain (Idaho), in Benewah County
Carpenter Mountain (Maine), in Piscataquis County
Carpenter Mountain (Oregon), in Linn County
Carpenter Mountain (Texas), in Jeff Davis County
Carpenter Mountain (Madison County, Virginia)
Carpenter Mountain (Alleghany County, Virginia)

References